The Mayflower Curling Club, was established in 1905. Since 1962 the club has been located at 3000 Monaghan Drive in Nova Scotia's Halifax Regional Municipality.

The club is one of the premier curling rinks in Nova Scotia, being home to teams headed by Colleen Jones, Mark Dacey, Shawn Adams, and Heather Smith-Dacey. The club was host for the curling events during the 2011 Canada Winter Games.

In 1912 the club's then-premises on Agricola Street was used as a temporary morgue for the bodies of Titanic disaster victims recovered from the North Atlantic by the Halifax-based ship the CS Mackay-Bennett, as it was the only site in the city that was both sufficiently large and cold enough for the task.

Following the 1917 Halifax Explosion, the devastated Agricola Street rinks were rebuilt.

National champions
2010 Canadian Mixed Curling Championship: Mark Dacey, Heather Smith-Dacey, Andrew Gibson, Jill Mouzar
2004 Nokia Brier: Mark Dacey, Bruce Lohnes, Rob Harris, Andrew Gibson
2004 Scott Tournament of Hearts: Colleen Jones, Kim Kelly, Mary-Anne Arsenault, Nancy Delahunt
2003 Scott Tournament of Hearts: Colleen Jones, Kim Kelly, Mary-Anne Waye, Nancy Delahunt
2003 Canadian Mixed Curling Championship: Paul Flemming, Kim Kelly, Tom Fetterly, Cathy Donald
2002 Scott Tournament of Hearts: Colleen Jones, Kim Kelly, Mary-Anne Waye, Nancy Delahunt
2002 Canadian Mixed Curling Championship: Mark Dacey, Heather Smith-Dacey, Rob Harris, Laine Peters
2001 Scott Tournament of Hearts: Colleen Jones, Kim Kelly, Mary-Anne Waye, Nancy Delahunt
1999 Scott Tournament of Hearts: Colleen Jones, Kim Kelly, Mary-Anne Waye, Nancy Delahunt
1999 Canadian Mixed Curling Championship: Paul Flemming, Colleen Jones, Tom Fetterly, Monica Moriarty
1998 Canadian Mixed Curling Championship: Steve Ogden, Mary Mattatall, Geoff Hopkins, Heather Hopkins
1995 Canadian Mixed Curling Championship: Steve Ogden, Mary Mattatall, Geoff Hopkins, Heather Hopkins

References

External links
 Mayflower CC website

Curling clubs established in 1905
Curling clubs in Canada
Sports venues in Halifax, Nova Scotia
2011 Canada Winter Games
1905 establishments in Nova Scotia